Shiny Dixit (born 5 December 1991) is an Indian television actress. She is recognized for her roles in Jodha Akbar, Pyaar Ko Ho Jaane Do, Lajwanti and Zindagi Ki Mehek.

Filmography

Films

Television

Web series

References

External links 

Living people
Indian television actresses
1995 births